Swell Investing was a Santa Monica-based impact investing company founded by David Fanger.

The company facilitated investments in businesses that follow the guidelines of the UN High-level Political Forum on Sustainable Development. Founded in 2017, it was a financially backed subsidiary of Pacific Life. It was the first investment platform to focus exclusively on impact investment principles.

History
Fanger conceptualized Swell while working for Pacific Life in 2012. On a due diligence visit to another company, Fanger noted the employees' dissatisfaction with their company's values. This led Fanger to envision a business in which clientele could invest in socially responsible companies with positive values.

A precursor to Swell was launched in 2015 with a six-figure financial backing by Pacific Life, but it was not accredited by the Securities and Exchange Commission and therefore relied on a third party brokerage platform for transactions. The initial application failed as a result. With further backing from Pacific Life, the application was relaunched as Swell Investing with SEC accreditation. The new version of Swell went live in May 2017.

Companies in which clientele can invest through Swell are listed in a portfolio called the Impact 400. The companies in the Impact 400 follow the UN's 17 Sustainable Development Goals as determined by manual review Swell employees as opposed to the use of an algorithm. As of December 2017, Swell is managing $13 million worth of assets, and as of June 2018, had a total return of 30%. Also in 2018, Swell received an additional $30 million in funding from Pacific Life and was named one of the "50 LA Startups to Watch in 2019" by technology news aggregator Built in LA. Swell was awarded as the best web interface design by digital banking consulting firm 11FS in 2019.

Closure 
On July 24, 2019, Swell Investing announced that it will be shutting down operations effective immediately due to not being able to "achieve the scale needed to sustain operations in the current market."

Existing investors can withdraw their investment balance to their bank account, or transfer to another investment platform of their choice through the use of ACAT. Customers had until August 15, 2019 to begin an ACAT transfer, or until August 20, 2019 to transfer to their bank account.

References

External links
 

Financial services companies of the United States
Financial services companies established in 2017
Companies based in Santa Monica, California